Shu Junrong (born June 25, 1988 in Mayang, Hunan) is a former Chinese male slalom canoeist specializing in the C2 event with Hu Minghai. The pair competed together from 2003, when they were first paired until the 2013 National Games.

Early life
Shu was born into a Slalom canoeing family in Shiyantan village (石眼潭村), Jiangkouya town (江口墟镇), Mayang, Hunan. His elder brother Shu Yong (舒用) was the gold medalist in K1 at two national games and the gold medalist at the 2000 Asian Championships. His elder female cousin Shu Zhenghua (舒正华) was also a canoeist. Shu loved playing in the river near his house, he had been a good swimmer while he was a small child.

At the age of 13, in 2001, Shu left Mayang with his brother. They moved to Guangzhou, entering in Guangdong International Rowing Center and following his brother into slalom canoeing. He was selected for the national training team in 2003. In the same year, Shu and Hu Minghai were originally paired for three months. They made a good team and were permanently paired from then on. Shu became a full member of the Chinese canoe slalom team in 2006.

Career 
Shu competed with Hu in two Olympic Games, finishing in 10th at 2008 Beijing Olympics and the 6th in 2012 London Olympics. The pair won gold medal at the 2010 ICF World Cup Race 1 in Prague.  It was first time that Chinese canoeists won a C2 event at an ICF World Cup. From 2006 to 2012, the pair won four gold medals, one silver medal and two bronze medals in the ICF World Cup series, including ICF Asian Championships and Oceanian Championships. Between 2005 and 2013, Shu competed at the China National Games three times, winning gold medals in 2009 and 2013 and a silver medal in 2005.

World Cup individual podiums

1 Asia Canoe Slalom Championship counting for World Cup points
2 Oceania Championship counting for World Cup points

Career highlights 
 2013 National Games, gold medal, men's C2 
 2012 Olympics, 6th, men's C2 
 2010 Asian Games, gold medal, men's C2 
 2010 Asian Championships, gold medal, men's C2 
 2009 National Games, gold medal, men's C2 
 2009 Canoe Slalom World Championships, 8th, men's C2 (details)
 2008 Olympics, 10th, men's C2 
 2008 Canoe Slalom World Cup event Czech Republic, Prague, silver medal, men's C2 (details)
 2008 Canoe Slalom World Cup event Australia Penrith, gold medal, men's C2 (details)
 2007 Canoe Slalom World Cup Race 1 - Prague, Czech, bronze medal, men's C2 (details)
 2005 National Games, silver medal, men's C2
 2005 Holiday Cup National canoe slalom championships - Zijin Huang Tang slalom base, gold medal, men's C2 (details)

References

1988 births
Living people
People from Huaihua
People from Huizhou
Sportspeople from Hunan
Olympic canoeists of China
Canoeists at the 2008 Summer Olympics
Canoeists at the 2012 Summer Olympics
Asian Games medalists in canoeing
Canoeists at the 2010 Asian Games
Asian Games gold medalists for China
Chinese male canoeists
Medalists at the 2010 Asian Games